HMS Verulam was an Admiralty V-class destroyer of the Royal Navy. She was built by Hawthorn Leslie and was launched on 3 October 1917. She struck a mine off the island of Seiskari in the Gulf of Finland on the night between 3–4 September 1919, and sank killing 16 crew.

The sunken destroyer was given to the state of Finland on 12 December 1919 together with her sister ship ; however, when salvage efforts began in 1925, it was found that both ships were broken in two and impossible to repair.

Notes

Bibliography
 
 
 
 
 

 
 

 

V and W-class destroyers of the Royal Navy
Ships built on the River Tyne
1917 ships
World War I destroyers of the United Kingdom
Shipwrecks in the Gulf of Finland
Maritime incidents in 1919
Ships sunk by mines